Bretton Hall College of Education was a higher education college  in West Bretton in the West Riding of Yorkshire, England.  It opened as a teacher training college in 1949 with awards from the University of Leeds. The college merged with the University of Leeds in 2001 and the campus closed in 2007.

History
In 1949 Bretton Hall College, a teacher training college founded by Alec Clegg specialising in innovative courses in design, music and the visual and performance arts, opened in the historic Bretton Hall in West Bretton, Yorkshire. It became an affiliated college of the University of Leeds, which validated its degrees.

The college had financial difficulties, and, with the support of the Higher Education Funding Council for England (HEFCE), merged with the University of Leeds in August 2001. Most of the music, fine art and teacher training courses were moved to the Leeds campus, but visual and performing arts education and creative writing remained at the Bretton site, which became home to the University's School of Performance and Cultural Industries.

In December 2004 the university's governing body reversed an earlier decision and decided that the Bretton Hall site was not financially viable, and the School of Performance and Cultural Industries should move to the main university campus in summer 2007, allowing all existing Bretton-based students to complete their studies there. The closure was documented on the BBC website by student Clair Parker.

In June 2006 it was announced that Bretton Hall was to be sold to Wakefield Council. On 3 May 2007 John Godber presented Final Curtain, a documentary on Bretton Hall, broadcast on BBC Radio 4. On 5 and 6 May 2007, a reunion was organised for the alumni and students of Bretton Hall between 1947 and 2007 as a celebration of the school's contribution to the arts industry and also the academic excellence it produced over sixty years. On the Saturday, Mike Levon staged a concert in the Music Salon. In November 2007 it was announced that Bretton Hall would be developed as a luxury hotel and spa.

The Yorkshire Sculpture Park (YSP) was founded in the college parkland by Bretton Hall lecturer Peter Murray CBE. YSP has become a leading international art centre renowned for art and performance in the landscape. When the college closed, Yorkshire Sculpture Park took over the estate grounds and lakes.

In May 2013 a series of special visits to the former hostels (halls of residence) was co-organised by Wakefield Council, YSP, the developer Rushbond and Bretton Hall alumni. Photographs were taken of every hostel room. A further event was organised in September 2013 to visit the mansion. Rushbond will ensure that a complete photographic record will be taken of the building before refurbishment.

Notable alumni

Anne Collins
Ian Boldsworth
Jon Clark (lighting designer)
Shelley Conn
Wil Edmunds
Beatie Edney
Michael Fentiman
Emma Fryer
Mark Gatiss
John Godber
Esther Hall
Carla Henry
Roger Hutchinson
Adrian Howells
Christine Kavanagh
Jonathan Kerrigan
Louisa Leaman
Simon Lightwood M.P.
Tom Lorcan
Kate McGregor
Wayne McGregor
Kay Mellor
Simon Messingham  
Richard O'Brien
Ray Peacock
Steve Pemberton
David Rappaport
Sir Ken Robinson
Stuart Semple
Reece Shearsmith
The Research
Mark Thomas
Chris T-T
Colin Welland
Gillian Wright

References

External links
 University of Leeds press release on the proposed closure of Bretton Hall Campus
 BBC news item about the sale to Wakefield Council
The Bretton Estate Archive website, - information on the history of the House and grounds
 Information about location of Bretton Estate archives, with contact details
 Alumni-driven website

Bretton Hall College
Buildings and structures in the City of Wakefield
Teacher training colleges in the United Kingdom
Defunct universities and colleges in England
1949 establishments in England
2007 disestablishments in England
University of Leeds